Soveyseh or Savaiseh may refer to:
 Soveyseh-ye Sadat
 Soveyseh-ye Saleh
 Soveyseh-ye Seh
 Soveyseh District
 Soveyseh Rural District